A general election was held in the U.S. state of Wyoming on Tuesday, November 4, 1902. All of the state's executive officers—the Governor, Secretary of State, Auditor, Treasurer, and Superintendent of Public Instruction—were up for election. Republicans held onto all statewide offices by landslide margins.

Governor

Incumbent Republican Governor DeForest Richards ran for re-election to a second term, and was renominated at the Republican convention. In the general election, he faced Cody Mayor George T. Beck, whom he defeated in a landslide to win a second term. However, several months into Richards's term, he died in office, elevating Secretary of State Fenimore Chatterton to the governorship and triggering a special election in 1904.

Secretary of State
Incumbent Republican Secretary of State Fenimore Chatterton ran for re-election to a second term. He was renominated by the Republican Party, and was opposed by the Democratic nominee, David N. Stickney, a cattleman from Laramie and the former principal of Rawlins city schools. Chatterton defeated Stickney in a landslide. Shortly into Chatterton's term, he became acting Governor upon the death of Governor DeForest Richards.

General election

Results

Auditor
Incumbent Republican State Auditor LeRoy Grant ran for re-election to a second term. He was renominated by the Republican Party and was opposed by Democratic nominee W. Dean Hayes, a cashier at the First National Bank of Meeteetse. Grant defeated Hayes in a landslide to win a second term.

General election

Results

Treasurer
Incumbent Republican Treasurer George E. Abbott was barred from seeking re-election. Accordingly, former State Treasurer Henry G. Hay was nominated by the Republican Party following a contentious selection at the state party convention. The Democratic convention nominated Colin Hunter, a former member of the territorial council and the former chairman of the territorial board of penitentiary commissioners. Hay ultimately defeated Hunter by a wide margin, enabling him to win his second non-consecutive term as State Treasurer. However, Hay would resign less than a year into his term, causing a special election to be held in 1904.

General election

Results

Superintendent of Public Instruction
Incumbent Republican Superintendent Thomas T. Tynan ran for re-election to a second term. Though he faced some opposition at the Republican convention, he was ultimately renominated. Anna Bramel DeLario, a former public school teacher in Laramie and a former instructor at the University of Wyoming, was nominated by the Democratic convention as their candidate to oppose Tynan. Tynan won re-election over DeLario by a wide margin.

General election

Results

References

 
Wyoming